Elizabeth Rogers Mason Cabot (1834–1920) was an American diarist and philanthropist.

Cabot was born in 1834 to a prominent Boston family. Her parents were William Powell Mason, a prominent lawyer, and Hannah Rogers Mason, a descendent of Harvard president John Rogers and of Thomas Dudley, governor of the Massachusetts Bay Colony. Growing up, Cabot lived in Boston and spent her summers in Walpole, New Hampshire. She married Walter Channing Cabot in 1860; the couple had five children and lived in Brookline and Manchester, Massachusetts.

Cabot died in 1920 (aged 85).

Philanthropy 
Cabot was involved in running the Home for Aged Colored Women in Boston, as well as the Children's Aid Society and the Woman's Education Association.

She was also a member of the Federal Street Unitarian Church (also known as the Arlington Street Church), where she taught Sunday school.

Diary 
Cabot's diary was published by Beacon Press in 1991 under the title, More Than Common Powers of Perception. The diary was edited by P.A.M. Taylor.

References 

American Unitarians
American women philanthropists
19th-century women philanthropists
19th-century American women writers
American diarists
Writers from Boston